The following is the final results of the 2006–07 Premier Soccer League football season.

Final table

Premier League awards 
 Player of the Season: Godfrey Sapula (Mamelodi Sundowns)
 Players' Player of the Season: Godfrey Sapula
 Coach of the Season: Muhsin Ertugral (Ajax Cape Town)
 Lesley Manyathela Golden Boot Award: Christopher Katongo (Jomo Cosmos)
 Young Player Award: Clifford Ngobeni (Jomo Cosmos)
 Goalkeeper of the Season: Calvin Marlin (Mamelodi Sundowns)
 Finest Moment of the Season: Mamelodi Sundowns vs Kaizer Chiefs (February 3, 2007)
 Perfectly Balanced Team of the Season: Mamelodi Sundowns
 Referee of the Season: Abdul Ebrahim
 Assistant Referee of the Season: Toko Malebo
 Supporters through Commitment Award: Bloemfontein Celtic

Top goalscorers 

 Last updated: May 20, 2007
 Source: PSL official website

References

External links 
 RSSSF competition overview

2006-07
South
1